Government Murray College Sialkot (often referred to as Murray College), formerly known as Scotch Mission College, is a government college located in Sialkot in the Punjab province of Pakistan.

History
Government Murray College Sialkot was established as Scotch Mission College by Scottish missionaries belonging to the Church of Scotland Mission in 1889. The Church of Scotland came to Sialkot (then Part of British India) in January 1857 when the first Scottish missionary, Reverend Thomas Hunter, came to live with his wife, Jane Scott, and baby son near the Brigade Parade Ground, facing the Trinity Church (whose first stone was laid on 1 March 1852). The church was consecrated by the Bishop of Madras on 30 January 1857. Sialkot at that time was in the diocese of Calcutta in British India. Thomas Hunter, his wife and baby son were murdered in Sialkot during the Indian Rebellion of 1857.

In 1972, the government of Pakistan dismissed the Scottish missionaries and nationalised the institution.

In 2005, a new block was established at the college by the Government of Pakistan.

Hostels
There is a hostel at the college for girls.

Faculties and departments

Murray College consists of three faculties and following departments are associated with these faculties;
Faculty of Natural Sciences
 Department of Chemistry
 Department of Information Technology
 Department of Mathematics
 Department of Physics
 Department of Statistics
Faculty of Social Sciences
 Department of BBA
 Department of English
 Department of Political science
 Department of Islamic Studies
 Department of Psychology
 Department of Urdu
 Department of Economics
Faculty of Biological Sciences
 Department of Botany
 Department of Zoology

Library
  Allama Iqbal Library

Principals
 Captain Jhon Murray
 Rev. Jhon Waugh (1909–1914)
 Rev. Dr. William Scott (1914–1923)
 Rev. Jhon Garret (1923–1914)
 Rev. D. Leslie Scott (1947–1956)
 R.C. Thomas
 F.S. Khairullah
 Ahmed Raza Siddiqui
 Qamar Malik

Notable alumni
Muhammad Iqbal, philosopher, lawyer, and politician
Faiz Ahmed, several times nominee for the Nobel Peace Prize
Kuldip Nayar, Indian journalist
Mumtaz Hamid Rao, head of news and current affairs of Pakistan Television
Zaheer Abbas, former captain of Pakistani National Cricket Team
Khalid Hasan, Pakistani journalist

References

External links
 Official website

Universities and colleges in Sialkot District
Educational institutions established in 1889
Universities and colleges in Sialkot
Universities and colleges in Pakistan
Sialkot
Buildings and structures in Sialkot